Akos Sandor (born 11 December 1977 in Szombathely) is a Hungarian-born Canadian male weightlifter, competing in the 105 kg category and representing Canada at international competitions. He participated at the 2004 Summer Olympics in the 105 kg event. He competed at world championships, most recently at the 2007 World Weightlifting Championships.

Major results

References

External links
 
 
 
 
 

1977 births
Living people
Canadian male weightlifters
Weightlifters at the 2004 Summer Olympics
Olympic weightlifters of Canada
Sportspeople from Szombathely
Hungarian emigrants to Canada
Commonwealth Games medallists in weightlifting
Commonwealth Games gold medallists for Canada
Commonwealth Games silver medallists for Canada
Weightlifters at the 2003 Pan American Games
Weightlifters at the 2007 Pan American Games
Weightlifters at the 1998 Commonwealth Games
Weightlifters at the 2002 Commonwealth Games
Weightlifters at the 2006 Commonwealth Games
Weightlifters at the 2010 Commonwealth Games
Pan American Games competitors for Canada
Medallists at the 1998 Commonwealth Games
Medallists at the 2002 Commonwealth Games
Medallists at the 2006 Commonwealth Games